Delarrin Turner-Yell (born December 16, 1999) is an American football safety for the Denver Broncos of the National Football League (NFL). He played college football at Oklahoma and was drafted by the Broncos in the fifth round of the 2022 NFL Draft.

College career
Turner-Yell was ranked as a three-star recruit by 247Sports.com coming out of high school. He committed to Oklahoma on August 26, 2017, over offers from Baylor, Houston, and Iowa.

Professional career
Turner-Yell was drafted by the Denver Broncos in the fifth round, 152nd overall, of the 2022 NFL Draft.

References

External links
Denver Broncos bio
 Oklahoma Sooners bio

1999 births
Living people
American football safeties
People from Hempstead, Texas
Players of American football from Texas
Sportspeople from the Houston metropolitan area
Oklahoma Sooners football players
Denver Broncos players